New Frankfort is an unincorporated community in Johnson Township, Scott County, in the U.S. state of Indiana.

History
New Frankfort was founded in 1838, and named after Frankfort, Kentucky, the native home of a large share of the early settlers.

A post office was established at New Frankfort in 1838, and remained in operation until it was discontinued in 1901.

Geography

References

Unincorporated communities in Scott County, Indiana
Unincorporated communities in Indiana